Flying High (also known as George White's Flying High and Happy Landing) is a 1931 American pre-Code musical film released by Metro-Goldwyn-Mayer, produced by George White, with lyrics by B. G. DeSylva and Lew Brown, music by Ray Henderson and additional songs by Dorothy Fields (lyrics) and Jimmy McHugh (music). The cast featured Bert Lahr, Charlotte Greenwood, Pat O'Brien, Charles Winninger and Hedda Hopper, with Gus Arnheim and his orchestra.

Plot
Waitress Pansy Botts (Charlotte Greenwood) places an ad in the Pilot's Gazette for a husband, offering a $500 reward, but is unsuccessful. At the nearby airfield, inventor Rusty Krouse (Bert Lahr) has built the "Aerocopter", intending to enter it in the upcoming 10th Annual Air Show. With finances depleted, Rusty looks to Sport Wardell (Pat O'Brien) for help in finding a wealthy investor. Soon, Fred Smith (Guy Kibbee) and his daughter Eileen (Kathryn Crawford) show some interest in the Aerocopter, but have no ready cash.

Rusty is worried that his partner will go to jail after accepting a check from Mr. Smith. Sport convinces him to marry Pansy and use her $500 dowry to salvage the company's future. Sport convinces Pansy that she is marrying the man in the picture (Clark Gable) he shows her. Nevertheless, she is instantly attracted to Rusty.

The deal with the Smiths falls through when both Smith and Sport are arrested for shady dealing. Sport tells his new love, Eileen, that he has to find bail money and the only way is for Rusty to fly his invention at the air show and win the prize money. In order to qualify as a pilot, Rusty ends up being examined by Doctor Brown (Charles Winninger), who thinks he is mad. Pansy chases after the reluctant groom, who has gotten cold feet, and finally traps him.

During the air show, both Pansy and Rusty end up at the airport and in the Aerocopter. After taking off clumsily, crashing through the roof of a hangar, once in the air, Rusty tells Pansy that an important part is out on the wing and they need it to land. Pansy climbs onto the wing, but has to parachute to safety. Rusty keeps flying higher, reaching a height of 53,000 feet before he releases fuel and eventually descends, passing Pansy on her way down. He crash-lands heavily at the airfield, emerging from the wreckage to find he has been awarded first prize. With the prize money saving the company, all the couples then happily reunite.

Cast

 Bert Lahr as Emil "Rusty" Krouse
 Charlotte Greenwood as Pansy Potts
 Pat O'Brien as "Sport" Wardell
 Kathryn Crawford as Miss Eileen Smith
 Charles Winninger as Dr. Brown
 Hedda Hopper as Mrs. Smith
 Guy Kibbee as Mr. Fred Smith
 Herbert Braggiotti as Gordon
 Gus Arnheim as himself, the orchestra leader
 Gus Arnheim and His Orchestra - themselves

Production
In 1927, Bert Lahr left burlesque to star in musical comedies on Broadway. After playing to packed houses, his reputation as a gifted comic led him to films. When the "talkies" came in, MGM brought producer George White's stage hit Flying High (1931) to the screen, giving Lahr his first film role.

A number of flying scenes were set at the Oakland Airport.

Music
Songs (lyrics by Dorothy Fields, music by Jimmy McHugh):
 "I’ll Make a Happy Landing" 
 "It’ll Be the First Time for Me"
 "We’ll Dance Until the Dawn"

The musical numbers "Happy Landing" and "Dance Until Dawn" were re-used in the MGM short Plane Nuts (1933) with the Three Stooges.

The film's musical numbers feature some of choreographer Busby Berkeley's earliest film work.

Reception
Flying High was received well by critics. In his review for The New York Times, Mourdant Hall commented: "Bert Lahr has a busy time in the diverting pictorial translation of the musical comedy, 'Flying High,' which breezed into the Capitol yesterday. Here there is comedy, a few songs and some excellent groupings of dancing girls. The general effect proved highly successful in provoking interest and laughter yesterday afternoon." The supporting cast also drew raves: "long-legged" Charlotte Greenwood, "who delivers her usual riotous brand of fun"; Pat O'Brien, Charles Winninger and Kathryn Crawford.

Box office
Flying High grossed a total (domestic and foreign) of $657,000: $476,000 from the US and Canada and $181,000 elsewhere resulting in a loss of $273,000.

See also
 Flying High (musical), the musical version

References

Notes

Bibliography
 Wynne, H. Hugh. The Motion Picture Stunt Pilots and Hollywood's Classic Aviation Movies. Missoula, Montana: Pictorial Histories Publishing Co., 1987. .

External links
 
 
 
 

1931 films
1931 musical comedy films
American musical comedy films
American aviation films
American black-and-white films
American films based on plays
Films directed by Charles Reisner
Metro-Goldwyn-Mayer films
1930s English-language films
1930s American films